Richard Charles Dashut (born September 19, 1951) is an American record producer who produced several Fleetwood Mac albums including Rumours, Tusk, Live, Mirage, Tango in the Night, and Time.

Dashut was born in West Hollywood, California, and started his career sweeping floors in a recording studio where he later met Buckingham and Stevie Nicks. Keith Olsen hired Dashut as a maintenance worker at Sound City and later employed him as second engineer on a few albums including Buckingham Nicks. In turn it led to Dashut's work with Fleetwood Mac. Dashut also co-wrote several songs with Lindsey Buckingham and co-produced two of his albums as well; they are Law and Order, and Out of the Cradle.

Discography
As You Will (1973) – Lambert and Nuttycombe – (assistant engineer)
Buckingham Nicks (1973) – Buckingham Nicks – (second engineer)
Rumours (1977) – Fleetwood Mac – (producer, engineer)
French Kiss (1977) – Bob Welch – (producer, engineer)
Not Shy (1978) – Walter Egan – (producer, engineer)
Tusk (1979) – Fleetwood Mac – (producer, engineer)
Uprooted (1979) – Rob Grill – (recording)
Three Hearts (1979) – Bob Welch – (producer, recording)
Live (1980) – Fleetwood Mac – (producer, live mixing)
Law and Order (1981) – Lindsey Buckingham – (producer, recording)
The Visitor (1981) – Mick Fleetwood – (producer, performer, photography)
Mirage (1982) – Fleetwood Mac – (producer, co-writer, engineer)
I'm Not Me (1983) – Mick Fleetwood – (producer, co-writer)
National Lampoon's Vacation (1983) – Lindsey Buckingham – (producer)
Back to the Future (1985) – Lindsey Buckingham – (producer)
A Fine Mess (1986) – Christine McVie – (producer)
Remembrance Days (1987) – The Dream Academy – (producer)
Tango in the Night (1987) – Fleetwood Mac – (producer, co-writer, engineer)
Greatest Hits (1988) – Fleetwood Mac – (producer, engineer)
The Very Best of Bob Welch (1991) – Bob Welch – (producer, engineer)
25 Years – The Chain (1992) – Fleetwood Mac – (producer, engineer, co-writer)
Out of the Cradle (1992) – Lindsey Buckingham – (producer, co-writer)
Altered Beast (1993) – Matthew Sweet – (producer)
Time (1995) – Fleetwood Mac – (producer)
The Very Best of Fleetwood Mac (2002) – Fleetwood Mac – (producer, co-writer, engineer)

With Buckingham Nicks

With Fleetwood Mac

Albums

Live albums and compilations

DVD and video releases
Classic Albums: Rumours (1997)
Tusk tour documentary (1982)
Mirage Tour (1982)

With Lindsey Buckingham

With Mick Fleetwood

Soundtrack appearances

Tours

 Fleetwood Mac tour – 
 Rumours tour – 1977–78
 Tusk tour – 1979–80
 Mirage tour – 1982

References

External links
 Richard Dashut's Interactive FM Blog
 Discography - 
 

Record producers from California
1951 births
Living people
People from West Hollywood, California
Grammy Award winners
American male songwriters